Please Baby Please is a 2022 American musical drama film directed by Amanda Kramer, who co-wrote the screenplay with Noel David Taylor. It stars Andrea Riseborough, Harry Melling, Karl Glusman, and Demi Moore.

The had its world premiere at the International Film Festival Rotterdam on January 26, 2022. It was released in the United States on October 28, 2022, by Music Box Films.

Premise
In 1950s Manhattan, a newlywed couple witnesses a murder and becomes the obsession of a greaser gang, awakening a sleeping quandary about the couple's sexual identity.

Cast
 Andrea Riseborough as Suze
 Harry Melling as Arthur
 Demi Moore as Maureen
 Karl Glusman as Teddy
 Ryan Simpkins as Dickie
 Matt D'Elia as Raymond
 Karim Saleh as Gene
 Jake Choi as Lon
 Jake Sidney Cohen as Rusell
 Cole Escola as Billy
 Jaz Sinclair as Joanne
 Dana Ashbrook as Cal
 Mary Lynn Rajskub as Lois

Production
In November 2019, Maya Hawke, Charlie Plummer, and Andrea Riseborough joined the cast of the film, with Amanda Kramer set to direct the film, from a screenplay she wrote alongside Noel David Taylor. In October 2020, Demi Moore, Harry Melling, and Karl Glusman joined the cast of the film, with Hawke and Plummer no longer attached. In November 2020, Ryan Simpkins, Karim Saleh, Jake Choi, Matt D'Elia, Jake Sidney Cohen, Cole Escola, Jaz Sinclair, Dana Ashbrook, and Mary Lynn Rajskub were cast in the film.

Principal photography began in Butte, Montana, in October 2020.

Release
The film had its world premiere at the International Film Festival Rotterdam on January 26, 2022. In June 2022, Music Box Films acquired distribution rights to the film. The film will be released in theaters on October 28, 2022.

Reception

References

External links
 
 

2022 films
2020s American films
2020s English-language films
2020s musical drama films
American musical drama films
Films set in the 1950s
Films set in Manhattan
Films shot in Montana